Ginka Steinwachs (born 31 October 1942) is a German educator and writer.

The daughter of Walter S. Steinwachs and Hildegard Feist, she was born Gisela Steinwachs in Göttingen and was educated in Munich, Berlin and Paris. Her PhD thesis on André Breton was later published as Mythologie des Surrealismus. Steinwachs has lectured at several universities in France and Germany. She married Tilbert Stegmann. Since 2000, she has been living in Berlin.

She has won:
 the literary prize of the city of Erlangen
 the literary prize of the city of Munich
 the Prix Hubert Fichte of the city of Hamburg

Selected works 
 Tränende Herzen (Crying hearts), play (1977)
 Marylinparis, novel (1978)
 Berliner Trichter. Bilderbogen (Berlin Funnel/Picture page) (1979)
 George Sand, play (1980)
 Ein Mund von Welt (A mouth full of world), prose (1989)
 Vollmund (Full mouth), prose (1991)

References 

1942 births
Living people
20th-century German novelists
21st-century German novelists
German women dramatists and playwrights
20th-century German dramatists and playwrights
21st-century German dramatists and playwrights
Writers from Göttingen
20th-century German women writers
21st-century German women writers
German surrealist writers